Nicolas Roberts (born ) is a Canadian male weightlifter, competing in the 94 kg category and representing Canada at international competitions. He competed at world championships, most recently at the 2011 World Weightlifting Championships.

Major results

References

1984 births
Living people
Canadian male weightlifters
Weightlifters at the 2010 Commonwealth Games
Commonwealth Games competitors for Canada
Place of birth missing (living people)
20th-century Canadian people
21st-century Canadian people